Jovan Jezerkić (Serbian Cyrillic: Јован Језеркић; 6 September 1920 – July 2000) was a Serbian football striker who represented the Serbian and Yugoslav national teams. He was also one of the first players to have played for both Belgrade rival clubs Red Star and Partizan.

Career

Club career
Born in Beška, Kingdom of Serbs, Croats and Slovenes, he begin playing in the youth team of SK Vitez Zemun. In 1936 he became senior and played for the team until 1945. That year he became a member of the newly formed Red Star Belgrade as part of the first squad ever of the club. With the exception of the first half season of 1947-48 that he played with FK Partizan (coincidentally a club that became their major rivals), he played with Red Star all the way until 1952, playing for them a total of 192 matches, 70 in the league, having scored 115 goals, 29 in league. In 1952 he moved to FK Radnički Beograd where, after playing the first season in the Second League, he helped them earn promotion to the Yugoslav First League. He played with them until 1956, scoring another 21 goals in the top league. He was a striker and a typical goal player.

National team
He played four matches for the Yugoslav national team having scored on five occasions. He was part of the Yugoslav team at the 1947 Balkan Cup where he made his national team debut.

Honours
Partizan
Yugoslav Cup: 1947

Red Star
Yugoslav First League: 1951
Yugoslav Cup: 1948, 1949, 1950

References

External links
 
 

1920 births
2000 deaths
Serbian footballers
Yugoslav footballers
Yugoslavia international footballers
Association football forwards
Red Star Belgrade footballers
FK Partizan players
FK Radnički Beograd players
Yugoslav First League players